Surprisingly Cilla is the title of Cilla Black's twelfth solo studio album. It was a spin-off from her television series, Surprise, Surprise, and the opening track is the show's theme tune. The album includes several re-recordings of Black's hit singles, originally recorded in the 1960s.

The album was conceived primarily as an attempt to capitalise on the success of the television series, which had drawn high ratings for ITV. Black was re-united with her former EMI producer David Mackay, but unlike their previous collaborations, neither he or Black were given any creative control over the project.

Although Black heavily promoted the album and its two singles, they failed to chart. Some months after the album's release, Towerbell Records shut down and no further copies of the album were released.

Re-release
In 2003, there were plans to re-issue the album on CD until it was discovered that the master tapes for the project had been lost. The re-issue project was therefore abandoned.

Track listing
Side A
 "Surprise Surprise" (Kate Robbins)
 "I Know Him So Well" (Benny Andersson, Tim Rice)
 "You're My World (Il Mio Mondo)" (Umberto Bindi, Gino Paoli, Carl Sigman) (Previously recorded in 1964) 
 "One More Night" (Phil Collins)
 "There's a Need in Me" (Doreen Chanter)
 "Conversations" (Roger Greenaway, Roger Cook, Jerry Lordan) (Previously recorded in 1969)
Side B
 "Step Inside Love" (John Lennon, Paul McCartney) (Previously recorded in 1967)
 "We're in This Love Together" (Roger Murrah, Keith Stegall)
 "I See Forever in Your Eyes" (Bob McDill)
 "Put Your Heart Where Your Love is" (Rick Palomibi, Denny Henson)
 "That's Already Taken" (A.Corrie)
 "You've Lost That Lovin' Feelin'" (Barry Mann, Cynthia Weil) (Previously recorded in 1964)

Credits
Personnel
 Lead Vocals - Cilla Black
 Producer - David Mackay
 Arranged - David Mackay, Allan Rogers and David Cullen
 Keyboards - Allan Rogers, Danny Schogger and David Mackay
 Bass - Paul Townsend
 Guitars - Tim Renwick
 Drums - Graham Jarvis and Tom Nichol
 Saxophone - Andy Mackintosh
 Artwork - Ian Hooton

References

Further reading
 

1985 albums
Cilla Black albums